Paul V. Woolley FACP is an American physician specializing in internal medicine.

Woolley has degrees from Cornell University and the University of Michigan, and was Professor of Medicine and Pharmacology at Georgetown University before moving to Johnstown, Pennsylvania to work in private practice. He also serves as Clinical Professor of Medicine at the University of Pittsburgh.

References

External links
List of publications

Living people
Cornell University alumni
University of Michigan Medical School alumni
Georgetown University Medical Center faculty
University of Pittsburgh faculty
Physicians from Pennsylvania
American oncologists
Year of birth missing (living people)